Michel Fauconnet (6 September 1909 – 1 November 1988) was a Swiss foil fencer. He competed at the 1928 and 1936 Summer Olympics.

References

External links
 

1909 births
1988 deaths
Swiss male foil fencers
Olympic fencers of Switzerland
Fencers at the 1928 Summer Olympics
Fencers at the 1936 Summer Olympics